Tallahassee Community College (TCC) is a public community college in Tallahassee, Florida.  It is part of the Florida College System and is accredited by the Southern Association of Colleges and Schools. As of fall 2017, TCC reported 24,639 students.

History
Tallahassee Junior College was founded in 1966 by the Florida Legislature; it was rebranded as Tallahassee Community College (TCC) in 1970. Prior to completion of the main campus, classes were held at Godby High School. Tallahassee Community College had an annual economic impact of $387.7 million .

The campus was built on what had been Tallahassee's airport, Dale Mabry Field, prior to the opening of the Tallahassee Municipal Airport in 1961. The former runways of the airport are still visible, and these paved areas are used primarily for parking.

Locations 
Tallahassee Community College serves the Tallahassee area and is located 1.9 miles from Florida State University. The surrounding area is primarily made up of student housing and commercial amenities that cater to college students. Besides being the capital of the state of Florida, Tallahassee is also a college town, with a total of more than 70,000 students studying at Florida State University, Florida A&M University, and Tallahassee Community College.

Campuses 

 Main Campus, located on the west side of Tallahassee, opened in 1967. The  campus serves as the main campus for the college.

Centers 
 Center for Innovation, located in downtown Tallahassee, houses conference rooms, business suites, meeting rooms, exhibit space and classrooms across the street from the Florida Capitol. Also home to the Institute for Nonprofit Innovation and Excellence (INIE) and the downtown Starbucks. 
 Florida Public Safety Institute (FPSI), located in Gadsden County, opened in 1977. FPSI offers corrections, criminal justice selection center, firefighter, law enforcement, security officer, and telecommunications programs.
 Gadsden Center, located in nearby Quincy, Florida, opened in 2016.
 Ghazvini Center for Healthcare Education, located in Tallahassee's medical corridor, opened in 2011. The Ghazvini Center offers over 85,000 square feet of space entirely devoted to programs in the healthcare field.
 Wakulla Center, located in Crawfordville, Florida, opened in 2006. The Center gives the students of Wakulla County opportunities to earn initial credits before continuing their studies on the main campus.
 Wakulla Environmental Institute (WEI), located in nearby Crawfordville, Florida, opened in 2016. WEI offers event space and a variety of programs related to the environment, including Oyster Aquaculture.

Academics 

TCC offers more than 70 academic and career programs and hundreds of different courses. Tallahassee Community College is one of the nation’s top community colleges. Many are preparing for transfer to a university (79 percent of TCC's A.A. graduates go on to study at state universities in Florida). TCC currently offers Associate in Arts (A.A.), Associate in Science (A.S.) and Bachelor's of Science in Nursing (BSN) degrees as well as several industry-recognized certificates.

Tuition
For the 2017–2018 academic year, tuition costs were:
 Undergraduate  $100.83 per credit hour for in-state students, and $387.87 per credit hour for out-of-state students.
 Nursing (BSN)  $100.83 per credit hour for ADN, $100.83 per credit hour for RN to BSN(lower division), and $128.51 for RN to BSN(upper division).
 Postsecondary  $2.67 per clock hour for in-state students, and $10.68 per clock hour for out of state students.

Enrollment

Tallahassee Community College students, numbering 24,639 in Fall 2017, come from all counties in Florida. The ratio of women to men is 54:46, and 48 percent are enrolled as full-time students.

Minorities constitute 51.7% of the student body. Of this number,  29.9% were African Americans, 14.3% were Hispanic and Latino Americans, and 7.5% identified with other categories. In 2017, 1.2% of TCC students were international students.

Almost half of all TCC students come from outside the Tallahassee area at 46%. Miami-Dade, Broward, Palm Beach, Hillsborough, and Duval counties make up the largest Florida counties for out of district students. This number is likely higher as many students enroll at TCC after having a district address.

Associate in Arts (A.A.) Program 
The Associate in Arts degree program consists primarily of liberal arts and sciences courses. This program culminates in a two-year liberal arts degree that can be transferred to a university which offers a bachelor's degree. The descriptions, course numbers and content of classes at TCC are the same as those in the first two years at Florida's public universities. TCC's liberal arts courses are also transferable to most public and private four-year schools in the U.S. Most students prepare and transfer to Florida State University or Florida A&M University after completing their degree.

Associate in Science (A.S.) Programs 
The Associate in Science programs consists of technology and applied sciences courses and are designed to prepare students for careers in skilled professions. Some of these programs enable them to transfer to a four-year college or university. Programs offered include Business Management, Criminal Justice Technology, Dental Hygiene, Early Childhood Development, Engineering Technology, Graphic Design and Web Technology, Nursing, Office Administration, Pharmacy Management and more.

Bachelor's degrees 
Tallahassee Community College offers a Bachelor of Science in Nursing (B.S.N.) program. This program allows students who hold a valid RN license to earn a Bachelor's degree in Nursing and offers training and research opportunities at area hospitals. Courses are administered through the Division of Healthcare Professions located at the Ghazvini Center for Healthcare Education (GCHE), an 85,000 square foot, state-of-the-art facility near Tallahassee Memorial Healthcare. The Ghazvini Center houses an accredited simulation center as well as a dedicated library, a 60-seat computer lab, and three skills labs.

TCC2FSU Program 

TCC2FSU ensures a seamless transfer experience into Florida State University for Tallahassee Community College Associate in Arts degree graduates as well as:
 One-on-one advising with transfer-focused TCC and FSU advisors
 Support for students who plan on applying for a limited-access program at FSU
 FSU Campus Recreation passes available for purchase per semester for eligible program participants
 Special transfer scholarships available

Many activities hosted at FSU are also open to TCC2FSU students like sailing and canoeing at the FSU Reservation, playing golf at Seminole Golf Course, bowling at Crenshaw Lanes, attending a concert at Club Downunder, or watching a movie at the Askew Student Life Center Theater.

In February 2015, Tallahassee Community College and Florida State University announced a new benefit for the TCC2FSU program. Current TCC students participating in the program can now purchase special passes for access to FSU Campus Recreation facilities, programs and services each semester. Current TCC students who are officially accepted into the TCC2FSU program can also purchase special membership passes through FSU Campus Recreation. These passes are good for an entire semester and include either access to FSU recreational facilities, the ability to participate in intramural sports, or both.

TCC2FSU guarantees admission to FSU whereas the 2+2 state articulation programs guarantees admission to one of Florida’s state universities, but not necessarily to one of the students' choice.

Housing and admissions information can be found on the official TCC2FSU website.

Student life 

Student opportunities include "TheatreTCC", the Capital Band of Tallahassee Community College, the TCC Jazz Band, and the Tallahassee Civic Chorale. A Student Government Association is open for student involvement, and the Office of Student Volunteerism encourages students to engage in community service. Students also participate in Forensics(Debate), Model UN, the Honors Program, Phi Theta Kappa. A student newspaper, the Talon, is published at least five times a semester by the students of a journalism class, and a literary magazine, The Eyrie, is published yearly. TCC annually hosts the Big Bend Brain Bowl academic tournament sponsored by the Tallahassee Democrat.

Fitness and sports
The Lifetime Sports Complex is a  complex located on the west side of Tallahassee Community College's main campus. The facility houses the Eagle Fitness Center and Recreation Gym. It contains three full-length basketball courts as well as multipurpose facilities for recreational usage. The recreation gym has open informal recreation time for basketball, volleyball, table tennis, and other sports. The recreation gym contains cardio and weight lifting equipment as well as group fitness classes. This facility is free to all students with a valid TCC ID.

Intramurals and club sports
TCC's Intramural Sports program provides all students, staff, and faculty the opportunity to participate in recreational sports and activities. These include a variety of team and individual sports and special events, such as flag football, basketball, indoor and outdoor soccer, volleyball, and dodgeball.

Campus and area transportation 
The TCC campus is served by four bus routes of the StarMetro Bus Service. The StarMetro Bus Service provides transportation to and from campus to the surrounding Tallahassee areas for Faculty, Staff, Students, and Visitors. The StarMetro bus also provides transportation to the surrounding student housing complexes around TCC and FSU. The Canopy bus goes straight from campus down West Tennessee Street and stops at Florida State University, restaurants, the Greyhound station, and to Governors Square Mall.

Tallahassee Community College is also served by the Tallahassee International Airport, which is located in the Southwest portion of Tallahassee and has daily services to Miami, Fort Lauderdale, Orlando, Tampa, Atlanta, Charlotte, and Dallas–Fort Worth.

Athletics 

TCC Athletics include men's basketball, women's basketball, baseball, softball, men's cross country, and women's cross country. The official mascot is the eagle. The school's athletic teams compete in the Panhandle Conference of the Florida College System Activities Association, a body of the National Junior College Athletic Association Region 8.

Currently, Mike McLeod is the baseball coach. McLeod guided the Eagles to Panhandle Conference championships in 1995, 1999, 2002, 2004, and 2009. His teams have made seven trips to the Florida Community College Activities Association Tournament. McLeod has been named Panhandle Conference Coach of the Year four times (1995, 1999, 2004, 2009). In February 2011, McLeod posted his 700th win as baseball coach of the TCC Eagles.

Awards and recognition
In 2013, Tallahassee Community College was listed first in the nation in graduating students with A.A. degrees by Community College Week.

Notable alumni

 Jason Bennett -  basketball player who last played for the Jacksonville Giants of the ABA
 Lorenzo Cain - Major League Baseball (MLB) outfielder for the Kansas City Royals who won the 2014 American League Championship Series Most Valuable Player Award
 John Crawford - author of the Iraq War memoir The Last True Story I'll Ever Tell
 Ryan Freel (1976–2012) - MLB player
 Clay Harvison - professional mixed martial artist formerly with Bellator MMA and the Ultimate Fighting Championship
 Marcus Hatten - former professional basketball player, 2006 top scorer in the Israel Basketball Premier League
 Cheryl Hines - actress, comedian, producer and director, known for her role as Larry David's wife Cheryl on HBO's Curb Your Enthusiasm, for which she was nominated for two Emmy Awards
 Bernard James - professional basketball player for the Shanghai Sharks of the Chinese Basketball Association (CBA)
 Michael Saunders - Canadian MLB center fielder for the Toronto Blue Jays
 Bootsy Thornton - professional basketball player who last played for Strasbourg IG in France
Gregory Tony (born 1978) - Sheriff of Broward County, Florida

References

External links

 
 Official athletics website

 
Education in Tallahassee, Florida
Educational institutions established in 1966
Universities and colleges accredited by the Southern Association of Colleges and Schools
Education in Leon County, Florida
Florida College System
NJCAA athletics
1966 establishments in Florida